Aarun Nagar is an Indian film director, writer, editor, producer and actor known for his works in Hindi-language films.

Early life and education
Nagar was born in the village of Dujana in Gautam Buddh Nagar district of Uttar Pradesh. He graduated from Delhi University.

Career

As an actor
Nagar started his acting career in 2003 with a devotional TV serial, based on Sai Baba as a lead role of Sri Sai. Nagar did about 25 TV serials on various Channels, i.e. Kaali – Ek Agnipariksha (Star Plus), Seven (Sony), Kismat (Sony), Vaseeyat (DD), Dhoondh Legi Manzil Humein (Star One), etc. These serials did reasonably well at that time and exposed him to many filmmakers in the industry, leading him to being cast in so many famous Bollywood Movies such as Bhouri alongside stalwarts like Raghuveer Yadav, Aditya Pancholi, Shakti Kapoor. He has consistently won rave reviews for all his performances in films such as Semshook (2010), Children of War (2014) Gurjar Aandolan (2014), Uvaa (2015) Bhouri (2016) Risknamaa (2019).

As a director
Nagar made his directorial debut as a writer and director in a real story based epic drama Gurjar Aandolan (2014), which was banned by the Rajasthan Government and never had a theatrical release in Rajasthan due to its issues based on the real 'Gurjar Agitation' which was happened in '2007-2008' in Rajasthan.

Later he released his next film Risknamaa a film based on the controversial love story based on two brother's life, where the elder brother falls in love with his younger brother's wife. It was released on 15 March 2019 to widespread critical appreciation, also achieved a critical and commercial success at the box office.

Filmography

Television

References

External links
 
 

Indian film directors
People from Ghaziabad district, India
Living people
Film directors from Delhi
Actors from Mumbai
Year of birth missing (living people)